Aces is one of eleven parishes (administrative divisions)  in Candamo, a municipality within the province and autonomous community of Asturias, in northern Spain. It is a town famous for its granaries of which there are over forty due to the abundance of chestnuts, which they are used to store.

It is located in the central area of the council, on the left bank of the river Nalón. It is bordered on the north by the parish of San Roman, to the northeast of the Valley on the east by the Crane, to the south of Prahu, and west by the San Tirso.

The main mode of communication of the parish is the CD-2 road, which links Aces Sandiche (Murias Parish) and Ferreras (parish of San Roman). It also has a station connecting to railway line built by the General Society of Asturian Basque Railways, which is now operated by LVEF and integrated into the local network of Asturias as line F-7, which communicates with Aces and San Esteban de Pravia Oviedo.

The parish is considered one of the areas of Asturias with a large number of granaries, most of them of great antiquity with numerous engravings on the doors. Prieto Bances refers to the weavers who used to be in Aces.

The parish church, dedicated to the Apostle Santiago, belonged to Queen Velasquita who in 1006 donated it to Bishop Ponce de Oviedo. The present building is nineteenth century but was rebuilt after the Spanish Civil War.

Villages
 Barredo
 Forna
 Reguero
 Sucro
 Pueblo

Parishes in Candamo